The 14th New York State Legislature, consisting of the New York State Senate and the New York State Assembly, met from January 5 to March 24, 1791, during the fourteenth year of George Clinton's governorship, in New York City.

Background
Under the provisions of the New York Constitution of 1777, the State Senators were elected on general tickets in the senatorial districts, and were then divided into four classes. Six senators each drew lots for a term of 1, 2, 3 or 4 years and, beginning at the election in April 1778, every year six Senate seats came up for election to a four-year term. Assemblymen were elected countywide on general tickets to a one-year term, the whole assembly being renewed annually.

In March 1786, the Legislature enacted that future Legislatures meet on the first Tuesday of January of each year unless called earlier by the governor. No general meeting place was determined, leaving it to each Legislature to name the place where to reconvene, and if no place could be agreed upon, the Legislature should meet again where it adjourned.

On January 27, 1790, the 13th New York State Legislature resolved that it was incompatible to hold a federal office at the same time as a seat in the Legislature, and declared the seats of James Duane, John Laurance, John Hathorn, Philip Schuyler and Rufus King vacant. Besides, Anthony Hoffman died early in 1790, leaving a total of four vacancies (Hathorn's term was expiring anyway) in the State Senate, to be filled by special elections.

In August 1790, the 1st United States Congress adjourned at Federal Hall and reconvened in December at Congress Hall in Philadelphia. In January 1791, the State Legislature returned to the vacated Federal Hall for the next three sessions before the State capital was permanently established at Albany in 1794.

On October 7, 1790, the "New Hampshire Grants Controversy" was settled when the State of New York recognized the status quo, and ceded formally the Counties of Cumberland and Gloucester to the Vermont Republic of which both counties de facto had been part since 1777.

At this time the politicians were divided into two opposing political parties: the Federalists and the Democratic-Republicans. However, at this early time party lines were not yet as distinctly drawn as they became in the 19th century. Many politicians changed sides, and voted according to their personal opinions on issues and people, what can be seen especially at the U.S. Senate election, in which Philip Schuyler, one of the leading Federalists, was voted down by a nominal Federalist majority of the Legislature.

Philip Schuyler had been elected to the U.S. Senate in 1789, and drew the Class 1 lot, so his seat came up for election by the Legislature.

Elections
The State election was held from April 27 to 29, 1790. Senators John Williams (Eastern D.) and Peter Schuyler (Western D.) were re-elected; and David Gelston (Southern D.), David Pye (Middle D.), and Assemblymen Philip Van Cortlandt (Southern D.) and Stephen Van Rensselaer (Western D.) were also elected to full terms in the Senate. Peter Lefferts (Southern D.), Leonard Gansevoort (Western D.) and Assemblymen Samuel Jones (Southern D.) and Thomas Tillotson (Middle D.) were elected to fill vacancies in the Senate.

Sessions
The Legislature was to meet for the regular session on January 4, 1791, at Federal Hall in New York City; both Houses assembled a quorum on the next day; and adjourned on March 24.

The Legislature elected NY Attorney General Aaron Burr a U.S. Senator from New York, to succeed Philip Schuyler. Schuyler was the Federalist candidate to succeed himself, Burr was the Democratic-Republican challenger. Although both Houses had a nominal Federalist majority, Burr won in the Senate by a vote of 12 to 4, and in the Assembly with a majority of 5 votes. Many of the Federalists took the opportunity to show their disapproval of both Schuyler's haughtiness and the financial policies of Schuyler's son-in-law Alexander Hamilton, the U.S. Secretary of the Treasury. Besides, the Livingston faction of the Federalist Party felt betrayed after the election of Rufus King over their candidate James Duane in 1789, and now allied themselves with Clinton and later became Democratic-Republicans.

On February 7, 1791, the Legislature re-apportioned the Senate and Assembly districts. The area of Columbia and Rensselaer counties were transferred from the Western to the Eastern District; and the Southern and the Western districts lost one senator each, which were added to the Eastern District. The total number of assemblymen was again set at 70; but several new counties were established: Herkimer (1), Ontario (1), Otsego (1), Rensselaer (5), Saratoga (4) and Tioga (1); Kings, Orange, Queens, Richmond, Suffolk, Ulster and Westchester lost 1 seat, and Montgomery and New York lost 2; and Columbia won 3 seats.

State Senate

Districts
The Southern District (9 seats) consisted of Kings, New York, Queens, Richmond, Suffolk and Westchester counties.
The Middle District (6 seats) consisted of Dutchess, Orange and Ulster counties.
The Eastern District (3 seats) consisted of Washington and Clinton counties.
The Western District (6 seats) consisted of Albany, Columbia and Montgomery counties.

Note: There are now 62 counties in the State of New York. The counties which are not mentioned in this list had not yet been established, or sufficiently organized, the area being included in one or more of the abovementioned counties.

Members
The asterisk (*) denotes members of the previous Legislature who continued in office as members of this Legislature. Samuel Jones, Philip Van Cortlandt and Thomas Tillotson changed from the Assembly to the Senate.

Employees
Clerk: Abraham B. Bancker

State Assembly

Districts
The City and County of Albany (7 seats)
Columbia County (3 seats)
Dutchess County (7 seats)
Kings County (2 seats)
Montgomery County) (6 seats)
The City and County of New York (9 seats)
Orange County (4 seats)
Queens County (4 seats)
Richmond County (2 seats)
Suffolk County (5 seats)
Ulster County (6 seats)
Washington and Clinton counties (4 seats)
Westchester County (6 seats)

Note: There are now 62 counties in the State of New York. The counties which are not mentioned in this list had not yet been established, or sufficiently organized, the area being included in one or more of the abovementioned counties.

Assemblymen
The asterisk (*) denotes members of the previous Legislature who continued as members of this Legislature.

Employees
Clerk: John McKesson

Notes

Sources
The New York Civil List compiled by Franklin Benjamin Hough (Weed, Parsons and Co., 1858) [see pg. 108 for Senate districts; pg. 114 for senators; pg. 148f for Assembly districts; pg. 165f for assemblymen]
Election result Assembly, Kings Co. at project "A New Nation Votes", compiled by Phil Lampi, hosted by Tufts University Digital Library
Election result Assembly, Queens Co. at project "A New Nation Votes"
Election result Assembly, Westchester Co. at project "A New Nation Votes"

1790 in New York (state)
1791 in New York (state)
014